Crescent Glacier is located on the southeast slopes of Mount Adams in the U.S. state of Washington in Gifford Pinchot National Forest. A small subpeak of Mount Adams, named South Butte, rises nearby. Crescent Glacier is close to the Gotchen Glacier which is located just to the east. Crescent Glacier lies in a small south-facing cirque with a steep headwall. Between 1904 and 2006, Crescent Glacier lost 6 percent of its surface area.

See also
List of glaciers in the United States

References

Glaciers of Mount Adams (Washington)
Mount Adams (Washington)
Gifford Pinchot National Forest
Glaciers of Yakima County, Washington
Glaciers of Washington (state)